As a reaction to the ongoing conflict and deteriorating humanitarian situation in Somalia, the United Nations Security Council imposed an open ended arms embargo on Somalia in January 1992.

The embargo was amended to allow arms supplies to Somali Government Forces in February 2007.

On 15 November 2019 the Security Council renewed the mandate until 15 December 2020, while also extending exemptions for the arms embargo and enforcement authorizations for the ban on illicit trade.

References

Embargoes
History of the United Nations
History of Somalia
Foreign relations of Somalia
Somalia